Senate elections were held in the Czech Republic on 2–3 October 2020 alongside regional elections, with second rounds on 9–10 October.

Electoral system
One-third of the 81-member Senate is elected every two years, giving Senators six year terms. Members of the Senate are elected in single-member constituencies using the two-round system.

Composition of contested seats prior to the elections

Districts
Elections were held in 27 districts:
3 – Cheb
6 – Louny
9 – Plzeň-City
12 – Strakonice
15 – Pelhřimov
18 – Příbram
21 – Prague 5
24 – Prague 9
27 – Prague 1
30 – Kladno
33 – Děčín
36 – Česká Lípa
39 – Trutnov
42 – Kolín
45 – Hradec Králové
48 – Rychnov nad Kněžnou
51 – Žďár nad Sázavou
54 – Znojmo
57 – Vyškov
60 – Brno-City
63 – Přerov
66 – Olomouc
69 – Frýdek-Místek
72 – Ostrava-City
75 – Karviná
78 – Zlín
81 – Uherské Hradiště

Results

Transfer of seats

Notes

References

Senate
Senate elections in the Czech Republic
Senate
Czech